Vyšniauskas is a Lithuanian surname, a Lithuanized form of the Polish surname Wiśniewski, see the latter article for other forms of the surname.

Notable people with the surname include:

Bronius Vyšniauskas (born 1923), Lithuanian sculptor
Ovidijus Vyšniauskas (born 1957), Lithuanian musician
Ramūnas Vyšniauskas (born 1976), Lithuanian weightlifter
Vidmantas Vyšniauskas (born 1969), Lithuanian footballer

Lithuanian-language surnames